Harmeet Desai is an Indian table tennis player. He is currently ranked 71 in the world as of August 2021. He is from Surat.
 In 2018 Commonwealth Games held at Gold Coast, Australia, He won gold in men's team event with Sharath Kamal, Anthony Amalraj, Sathiyan Gnanasekaran & Sanil Shetty and bronze in Men's doubles event with Sanil Shetty. Harmeet Desai won the men's singles title at Commonwealth Table Tennis Championships 2019 at Cuttak,India defeated favorite Sathiyan Gnanasekaran in a hard-fought final to claim the men's singles title. He has been honoured with the Arjuna Award by the Ministry of Youth Affairs and Sports, Government of India in 2019.

Achievements 

Harmeet Desai won a gold medal in the men's team and a bronze medal in the men's doubles category for table tennis at the Commonwealth Games 2018 that were held in Gold Coast, Queensland in Australia.He was awarded the Arjuna award by Indian President Ram Nath Kovind in August 2019 for his outstanding performance in table tennis.

He won the ITTF Indonesia Open Tournament in November 2019. This was a historic moment as he was the first Indian to win an ITTF tournament in the Asian Continent. In January 2020, he created history when he won the National Championship title for the year 2019 - 2020 as he was the first player from the state of Gujarat to win the National Champion title in table tennis. He was a member of the Indian Junior Team that created history by winning the Junior Championships. He participated and won a bronze medal in the 2018 Asian Games held in the city of Jakarta.

In  Birmingham 2022 Desai won Gold Medal in Men's Team Category with Sharath Kamal, Sathiyan Gnanasekaran & Sanil Shetty.

References 

1993 births
Living people
Table tennis players at the 2018 Commonwealth Games
Table tennis players at the 2022 Commonwealth Games
Commonwealth Games medallists in table tennis
Commonwealth Games gold medallists for India
Commonwealth Games bronze medallists for India
Racket sportspeople from Gujarat
Sportspeople from Surat
Table tennis players at the 2014 Asian Games
Table tennis players at the 2018 Asian Games
Asian Games medalists in table tennis
Asian Games bronze medalists for India
Medalists at the 2018 Asian Games
Indian male table tennis players
Recipients of the Arjuna Award
20th-century Indian people
21st-century Indian people
Medallists at the 2018 Commonwealth Games
Medallists at the 2022 Commonwealth Games
South Asian Games gold medalists for India
South Asian Games silver medalists for India
South Asian Games medalists in table tennis